Marie-Louise Hosdey (born 2 April 1945) is a Belgian sports shooter. She competed in the women's 10 metre air rifle event at the 1984 Summer Olympics.

References

1945 births
Living people
Belgian female sport shooters
Olympic shooters of Belgium
Shooters at the 1984 Summer Olympics
Sportspeople from Hainaut (province)
20th-century Belgian women